Pirate Adventure  (also known as Pirate Cove) is a text adventure program written by Scott Adams.

Description
Published by Adventure International and the second game of the series, after Adventureland, this text-based adventure game was one of many adventure games created by Scott Adams, in this case based on his wife Alexis's ideas. The setting was inspired by Robert Louis Stevenson's 1883 novel Treasure Island and involved a quest to retrieve Long John Silver's lost treasures.

Gameplay involved moving from location to location, picking up any objects found there, and using them somewhere else to unlock puzzles. Commands took the form of verb and noun, e.g. "Climb Tree".

The player started the game in a flat, and progressed via a bit of magic to Pirates Island. Here, the player had to build a ship to reach Treasure Island and there find two pieces of treasure. The player also had to contend with an unpredictable pirate ally; it was the first text adventure game of the Adams series in which the player shared the adventure with a second character.

The magic phrase to reach the island in this game, 'Say Yoho', was the name of a long-running column in SoftSide magazine by Scott Adams.

Source code
The source code for Pirate Adventure was printed in the December 1980 issue of BYTE, with an addendum in April 1981. This enabled others to discover how the engine worked and to create their own adventures using this or a similar design.

Reception
Pirate Adventure was reviewed in issue #42 of The Dragon magazine. The reviewer, Mark Herro, commented on the difficulty of the game: "Supposedly one of the "easier" programs of the series, I'm embarrassed to say that I have yet to find a treasure in Pirate Adventure... This Program has been sending me in circles for weeks."

Bruce Campbell reviewed Pirate's Cove in The Space Gamer No. 36. Campbell commented that "Pirate's Cove is a good first adventure (some of the others are harder), but also entertaining for the experienced adventurer."

Reviews
Home Computing Weekly - Apr 17, 1984
Commodore User - Aug, 1985
Computer and Video Games #41 - 1985/Mar
Computer and Video Games #67 - 1987/May

References

External links

1979 video games
Adventure games
Adventure International games
Apple II games
Atari 8-bit family games
BBC Micro and Acorn Electron games
Commercial video games with freely available source code
Commodore 64 games
Commodore 16 and Plus/4 games
Commodore PET games
VIC-20 games
Dragon 32 games
TI-99/4A games
TRS-80 games
Video games about pirates
Video games developed in the United States
ZX Spectrum games